Prang may refer to:

Places
Prang, Khyber Pakhtunkhwa, a town of Charsadda District, Khyber Pakhtunkhwa province, Pakistan
Prang Besar, an old name for Putrajaya, Kuala Lumpur, Malayasia
Prang Ghar Tehsil or Pran Ghar Subdivision, a subdivision of Pakistan
Prang Ku District, a district in Sisaket Province, northeastern Thailand
Bu Prang Camp, a former army camp in Vietnam
Prang, Ghana, a settlement of Pru East District, Bono East Region, Ghana
Prang, a tourist spot in Ganderbal district, Jammu and Kashmir, India

Other uses
Prang (architecture), a type of South-East Asian temple spire
Pranger, a type of German public humiliation device
Prang language, spoken by the Kơho people in the region of Di Linh, Vietnam
Prang, an art supply brand founded by Louis Prang and now owned by Dixon Ticonderoga
an RAF slang term for an airplane crash
an Australian, New Zealand and British slang for a minor traffic accident

People with the surname
Ernie Prang, a character in the Harry Potter stories
Ith Prang (fl. 2003), Cambodian politician
Louis Prang (1824–1909) American printer, lithographer, and "father of the Christmas card"